All in All may refer to:

"all in all", eschatological phrase from 1 Corinthians 15:28
All In All  2015, compilation of first three EPs of Bob Moses (band)
"All in All", single by Stella Getz
"All in All", song by Shania Twain from Now (Shania Twain album)